Sujrai State was a princely state in British India. In legend it formed part of the mythological land of Braj ruled by Krishna .

History
Sujrai was the small state of the Jodha Rathore's. Raja Iswari Prasad Narayan Singh was the last Jodha King of this state. Raja Iswari Prasad Narayan Singh had only one daughter Rajkumari Sohan Kanwar who married Thakur Jai Singh Th. Jounl (distt. Karauli).

Raja Surat Singh of Bikaner settled Moti Singh of the branch of Jodha Rathore from sujrai princely state in Bikaner in 1801.

Raja Laxman Singh was born on 9 October 1826 at Wazirpur Agra, Uttar Pradesh. Raja Laxman Singh was a polyglot -  He was proficient in,English,Sanskrit and Hindi,Urdu .
 
After finishing his college education, he was appointed in the office of lieutenant governor of northwestern state. Heworked very efficiently and in 1855 he was appointed Tehsildar of Etawah. In the revolt of 1857, He had helped the Britishers a lot and the British gave him the post of Deputy Collector. In 1870 AD, Laxman Singh was awarded the title of "Raja" and the princely state.
 
While in the service of the British government, In 1861, he took out a letter called "Pahjahiteshi" from Agra. In 1863, the Hindi translation of the epic Kalidas' immortal "Abhigyan Shakuntalam" was published in the name of "Shankutala Natak". People were amazed to see the specimen presented by you in Hindi. King Shivaprasad Satterhind gave this composition a place in his "Gutka". Famous Hindi lover Friedrich Pinkat of that time was very impressed by his language and style and published it in 1875 in England. Laxman Singh got enough fame from this work and he was accepted as a textbook in the examination of the Indian Civil Service. This gives the writer both riches and respect. With this respect, the Raja Sahab got more encouragement and he translated Kalidas's "Raghuvamsa"  and "Meghaduta"  in Hindi and clarifying his language policy in its role said - "In our opinion, two dialects are Hindi and Urdu, Hindi is spoken by the Hindus of this country, and Urdu is spoken by the Hindus here and there. The Sanskrit posts are very popular in Hindi, Arabic in Urdu but Persian It is not necessary that Arabic should be spoken without Persian words and neither do we call that language in Hindi, in which the words of Arabic-Persian have been filled. "
 
Raja Laxman Singh was a member of "Fellow" and "Royal Asiatic Society" of Calcutta University. In 1888, when he was released from the service of the government, he became the Chief Chairman of Agra's Chungi and kept this post for until his demise. His companion Raja Shiv Prasad, who was the Vice Chairman of Agra Chungi, also did a great job in Hindi literature.
 
Raja Laxman Singh had two wives, Rani Sahiba Gainda Kanwar and Rani Jugraj Kanwar. He had a son and a daughter. Kunwar Surajbhan Singh had died young after drowning into a pond, in memory of him a clock tower was built in Mainpuri(u.p) Rani Sahiba Jugraj Kanwar had built a library in the memory of Kunwar Surajbhan at the place of the pond. This library has collection of biographies of great men, novels and comics for children. 
 
Raja Laxman Singh adopted Ishwari Prasad Narayan Singh. He had a daughter. Princess Sohan Kanwar, daughter of Ishwari Prasad Narayan Singh, was married to Thakur Sahab Jai Singh (Kalyanot) of Jounl, district Karauli. Jounl was a vassal of 10 horses of Kalyanot Rajputs. Raja Ishwar Prasad Singh adopted Kishore Singh Ji, the younger son of Thakur Sahib Jai Singh Ji Thikana Jounl. Raja Kishore Singh was married to Rajkumari Dhan Kanwar, Raja Kishore Singh ji's son Raja Giriraj Singh Jounl who is now the heir, his son is Kunwar Shimbhu Singh Jounl.
 
Raja Laxman Singh of the princely state of Sujrai built a temple. Idols of Ganga, Jamuna, Saraswati were installed. Now these idols have been installed in the temple of Maharaj Ji Baba.
 
Today the ruins of the temple are present at that place. 
 
Raja Laxman Singh built the Sujrai Fort. Two palaces were built inside it, in one Queen Gainda Kanwar and in the other Queen Jugraj Kanwar lived, today the fort has been ruined.
 
Due to an inheritance dispute, the entire property has turned into a ruin.

See also
Political integration of India
Rajputana Agency

Raja Sahab Giriraj Singh 
royal family of sujrai

References

External links
 Mainpuri District official web site

Rajputana Agency
Rajputs
1949 disestablishments in India